Herb(ert) Drury may refer to:

Herbert Drury (gymnast) (1883–1936), British Olympic gymnast
Herb Drury (1895–1965), Canadian-born American ice hockey player

See also
Drury (disambiguation)